OpenStax (formerly OpenStax College) is a nonprofit educational technology initiative based at Rice University. Since 2012, OpenStax has created peer-reviewed, openly-licensed textbooks, which are available in free digital formats and for a low cost in print. Most books are also available in Kindle versions on Amazon.com and in the iBooks Store. OpenStax's first textbook was College Physics, which was published online, in print, and in iBooks in 2012. OpenStax launched OpenStax Tutor Beta in June 2017, adaptive courseware based on cognitive science principles, machine learning, and OpenStax content. However, announced in October 2022 that Tutor was being discontinued. 

Aiming to compete with major publishers' offerings, the project was initially funded by the Bill and Melinda Gates Foundation, the William and Flora Hewlett Foundation, the Michelson 20 Million Minds Foundation, and the Maxfield Foundation. All textbook content is licensed under Creative Commons Attribution Licenses; specifically, the books are available under the CC BY license (except for Calculus, which is CC BY-NC-SA), which means that instructors are able to use, adapt, and remix the content, as long as they attribute OpenStax.

In 2017, OpenStax announced that they were partnering with UK Open Textbooks to spread the use of their open content in the UK, and partnering with Katalyst Education to form OpenStax Polska, bringing Polish-language versions of select OpenStax books to universities in Poland.

In 2022 OpenStax declared their product saved US$1.7 billion in education costs since 2012, 6 million students from 139 countries and 63 percent of higher education institutions in US use OpenStax.

Editorial process 
OpenStax textbooks follow a traditional peer review process aimed at ensuring they meet a high quality standard before publication. Textbooks are developed and peer-reviewed by educators in an attempt to ensure they are readable and accurate, meet the scope and sequence requirements of each course, are supported by instructor ancillaries, and are available with the latest technology-based learning tools. The editors to encourage reviews of the book, slides and other teaching materials. However, notwithstanding the peer-review process, the books have come under criticism for the large numbers of typos and other errors they contain.

The free, online version of OpenStax books are kept up-to-date on an ongoing basis. Instructors are encouraged to submit errata suggestions via the OpenStax website, and errata suggestions are reviewed by subject matter experts. Revisions are made when it is determined to be pedagogically necessary. New PDFs and print versions of the books are released each summer when substantial changes are present.

OpenStax's original goal was to publish openly licensed textbooks for the 25 highest-enrolled undergraduate college courses: they achieved that goal in 2016. In September 2020 they announced plans to double the number of textbooks they offer.

See also
 Open educational resources
 OpenCourseWare
 OpenStax CNX
 Open Course Library
 Open.Michigan
 Rice University Press, Rice's all-digital platform based on the Connexions technology
 Wikiversity, a Wikimedia Foundation project, devoted to learning materials and activities

Notes

External links

 OpenStax official website
 TED Talk dated 2006-02 Founder Richard Baraniuk discussing Connexions
 American Astronomical Society video on the OpenStax Astronomy Textbook Interview with Lead Author Andrew Fraknoi

American educational websites
Open educational resources
Rice University
Organizations established in 2012
2012 establishments in Texas
Educational publishing companies
Educational publishing companies of the United States
Textbook publishing companies